WDNJ is a Spanish language Christian radio station licensed to Hopatcong, New Jersey, broadcasting on 88.1 MHz FM. WDNJ serves Sussex and Morris Counties in New Jersey.  WDNJ is also carried on WMBC-TV's digital subchannel 63.8.

References

External links

DNJ
DNJ